Ramona E. Douglass was an American activist. She was a medical sales and marketing professional and one of the most prominent advocates for multiracial Americans.

She is of African American, Native American (Oglala), and Sicilian heritage. Douglass was a community activist for almost 30 years. She was a founding member of the National Alliance Against Racist and Political Repression and participated with Angela Davis' Political Defense Committee in the early 1970s.

In 1986 Douglass became active in the Biracial Family Network, one of the United States' oldest community organizations advocating for mixed heritage people and families. On November 12, 1998, the Biracial Family Network joined similar organizations in the U.S. and Canada to create the Association of MultiEthnic Americans (AMEA). Douglass, an AMEA co-founder, served as the organization's vice president (1988–1991), president (1994–1999) and Director of Media and Public Relations (2000–2005). She served on AMEA's Advisory Council until her death in 2007.

Douglass was a prominent spokesperson for multiracial issues during the debates preceding Census 2000. In 1993, she testified before Rep. Thomas C. Sawyer's (D-OH) Subcommittee on Census, Statistics & Postal Personnel in favor of adding a "multiracial" category to the 2000 Census. In 1995, she was appointed, by then Secretary of Commerce Ron Brown, to the 2000 Census Advisory Committee. As AMEA's representative on the committee for 13 years, she contributed a multiracial personal and community organizing perspective. In 1997, Douglass testified before the Subcommittee on Government Management, Information and Technology of the House Committee on Government Reform and Oversight on behalf of multiracial Americans.

A graduate of Colorado State University with a Bachelor of Science degree in Geology and Chemistry, Douglass also had a distinguished career in medical sales and marketing.

References

The founding meeting of the Association of MultiEthnic Americans (AMEA) took place on November 12, 1988, not 1998.

External links
Ramona Douglass' Congressional Testimony before the Subcommittee on Government Management and Technology (May 22, 1997)
Upgrading America's Conversations on Race: The Multi-Race Option for Census 2000 by Ramona E. Douglass (June 2000)
Association of MultiEthnic Americans (Official website)

Year of birth missing (living people)
Living people
African-American people
American people of Lakota descent
American people of Italian descent
Minority rights activists
Multiracial affairs in the United States
American marketing people
Marketing women